Dingo Beach is a coastal rural locality in the Whitsunday Region, Queensland, Australia.

Geography 
The Coral Sea forms the northern boundary of the locality. Along the coast are (from west to east):

 Shoal Bay, at the north-west of the locality
 Black Currant Island, a  marine island
 Dingo Beach (the beach)
 Manta Ray Island, a  marine island
 Nelly Bay, at the north-east of the locality

History 
In 1926, the growing use of automobiles enabled people to travel more widely and resulted in the "discovery" of the beach by motorist J. M. Harkness and it was named Dingo Beach. People from Proserpine and Bowen then began using the beach for recreation, although the road was described as being very rough. Despite this, the beach became a popular camping and holiday place for people living in Proserpine and Bowen.

It officially became a town in 1966 but is no longer gazetted as a town today.

Education 
There are no schools in Dingo Beach. The nearest government primary school is Proserpine State School and the nearest government secondary school is Proserpine State High School, both in Proserpine to the south-east.

Amenities 
There is a single pub, petrol station and convenience store which services both Dingo Beach and nearby Hideaway Bay.

Gloucester SES Facility is at 10 Dingo Beach Road.

There is a boat ramp off Deicke Crescent allowing boats to be launched into the Coral Sea at the beach Dingo Beach. It is managed by the Whitsunday Regional Council.

References 

Whitsunday Region
Coastline of Queensland
Localities in Queensland